The Bermuda men's national tennis team represents Bermuda in Davis Cup tennis competition and are governed by the Bermuda Lawn Tennis Association.

Their best finish is eighth in Group III.

History
Bermuda competed in its first Davis Cup in 1995.

Current team (2022) 

 James Finnigan
 Tariq Simons
 Richard Mallory (Captain-player)
 Gavin Manders

See also
Davis Cup
Bermuda Fed Cup team

External links

Davis Cup teams
Davis Cup
Davis Cup